Daphnella galactosticta is a species of sea snail, a marine gastropod mollusk in the family Raphitomidae.

This is a taxon inquirendum.

Description

Distribution
This marine species occurs off New Caledonia and off Lifou, Loyalty Islands.

References

 Hervier, J., 1898 Description d'espèces nouvelles de mollusques, provenant de l'archipel de la Nouvelle-Calédonie (suite) Journal de Conchyliologie, 45"1897" 165-192
 Bouchet, P., Heros, V., Laboute, P., Le Goff, A., Lozouet, P., Maestrati, P., & de Forges, B. R. (2001). Atelier biodiversité: lifou 2000, grottes et récifs coralliens. IRD.

External links
 Hervier R.P. (1897), Descriptions d'espèces nouvelles provenant de l'Archipel de la Nouvelle Calédonie (suite); Journal de conchyliologie t.45 s.3 (1897)
 Héros, Virginie, et al. "Mollusca of New Caledonia." Compendium of Marine Species from New Caledonia, ed 2 (2007): 199-254.
 

galactosticta
Gastropods described in 1897